Birkenhead is a settlement in Overberg District Municipality in the Western Cape province of South Africa.  It is located on the Danger Point Peninsula (Birkenhead Peninsula) on the southern side of Walker Bay. It is in Ward 2 of Overstrand Local Municipality.

References

External links
 

Populated places in the Overstrand Local Municipality